In American politics, a conservative Democrat is a member of the Democratic Party with conservative political views, or with views that are conservative compared to the positions taken by other members of the Democratic Party. Traditionally, conservative Democrats have been elected to office from the Southern states, rural areas, the Rust Belt, and the Midwest. In 2019, the Pew Research Center found that 14% of Democratic and Democratic-leaning registered voters identify as conservative or very conservative, 38% identify as moderate, and 47% identify as liberal or very liberal.

21st century conservative Democrats are similar to liberal Republican counterparts, in that both became political minorities after their respective political parties underwent a major political realignment, which began to gain speed in 1964. Prior to 1964, both parties had their liberal, moderate, and conservative wings, each of them influential in both parties. During this period, conservative Democrats formed the Democratic half of the conservative coalition. After 1964, the conservative wing assumed a greater presence in the Republican Party, although it did not become the mainstay of the party until the nomination of Ronald Reagan in 1980. The Democratic Party retained its conservative wing through the 1970s with the help of urban machine politics while blue-collar workers still aligned with the Democrats. This political realignment was mostly complete by 1980.

After 1980, the Republicans became a mostly conservative party, with conservative leaders such as Newt Gingrich, Trent Lott, and Tom DeLay. The Democrats, while keeping their liberal base intact, grew their centrist wing, the New Democrats, in the 1990s, with leaders such as Bill Clinton, Al Gore, and Evan Bayh. In the U.S. House of Representatives, the New Democrat Coalition represents the moderate wing of the Democratic Party, and the Blue Dog Coalition represents centrist and conservative Democrats.

History

1876–1964: Solid South

The Solid South describes the reliable electoral support of the U.S. Southern states for Democratic Party candidates for almost a century after the Reconstruction era. Except for 1928, when Catholic candidate Al Smith ran on the Democratic ticket, Democrats won heavily in the South in every presidential election from 1876 until 1964 (and even in 1928, the divided South provided most of Smith's electoral votes). The Democratic dominance originated in many Southerners' animosity towards the Republican Party's role in the Civil War and Reconstruction.

1874–1928: Rise of agrarian populism
In 1896, William Jennings Bryan won the Democratic Party nomination by promoting silver over gold, and denouncing the banking system. He had a strong base in the South and Plains states, as well as silver mining centers in the Rocky Mountain states. He was weak in urban areas and immigrant communities which opposed prohibition. He also won the Populist nomination. Conservative Democrats opposed him, especially in the Northeast where "Gold Democrats" were most active. "Gold Democrats" were supporters of Grover Cleveland, the hero of conservative Democrats. They formed the National Democratic Party (United States) and nominated John M. Palmer (politician), former governor of Illinois, for president and Simon Bolivar Buckner, former governor of Kentucky, for vice-president. They also nominated a few other candidates, including William Campbell Preston Breckinridge for Congress in Kentucky, but they won no elections.  Bryan and people he supported (especially Woodrow Wilson) usually dominated the party. However the conservatives did nominate their candidate in 1904, Alton B. Parker.

1932–1948: Franklin D. Roosevelt and the New Deal coalition

The 1932 election brought about a major realignment in political party affiliation. Franklin D. Roosevelt forged a coalition of labor unions, liberals, Catholics, African Americans, and southern whites. Roosevelt's program for alleviating the Great Depression, collectively known as the New Deal, emphasized only economic issues, and thus was compatible with the views of those who supported the New Deal programs but were otherwise conservative. This included the Southern Democrats, who were an important part of FDR's New Deal coalition. A number of chairmanships were also held by conservative Democrats during the New Deal years.

Conservative Democrats came to oppose the New Deal, especially after 1936. They included Senator Harry F. Byrd and his powerful state organization in Virginia, Senator Rush Holt Sr., Senator Josiah Bailey, and Representative Samuel B. Pettengill. The American Liberty League was formed in 1934, to oppose the New Deal.  It was made up of wealthy businessmen and conservative Democrats including former Congressman Jouett Shouse of Kansas, former Congressman from West Virginia and 1924 Democratic presidential candidate, John W. Davis, and former governor of New York and 1928 Democratic presidential candidate Al Smith. In 1936, former U.S. Assistant Secretary of War, Henry Skillman Breckinridge ran against Roosevelt for the Democratic nomination for president. John Nance Garner, of Texas, 32nd Vice President of the United States under Roosevelt, a conservative Southerner, broke with Roosevelt in 1937 and ran against him for the Democratic nomination for president in 1940, but lost.  By 1938 conservative Democrats in Congress—chiefly from the South—formed a coalition with Republicans that largely blocked liberal domestic policy until the 1960s.

However, most of the conservative Southern Democrats supported the foreign policy of Roosevelt and Truman.

Roosevelt tried to purge the more conservative Democrats in numerous states in 1938. He especially tried to unseat those up for reelection who defeated his plan to pack the Supreme Court in 1937. He failed in nearly all cases, with a major success in defeating John J. O'Connor in Manhattan, a spokesman for big business.

A different source of conservative Democratic dissent against the New Deal came from a group of journalists who considered themselves classical liberals and Democrats of the old school, and were opposed to big government programs on principle; these included Albert Jay Nock and John T. Flynn, whose views later became influential in the libertarian movement.

1948–1968: Segregationist backlash

The proclamation by President Harry S. Truman and Minneapolis Mayor Hubert Humphrey of support for a civil rights plank in the Democratic Party platform of 1948 led to a walkout of 35 delegates from Mississippi and Alabama. These southern delegations nominated their own States Rights Democratic Party, better known as the Dixiecrats, nominees with South Carolina Governor Strom Thurmond leading the ticket (Thurmond would later represent South Carolina in the U.S. Senate, and join the Republicans in 1964). The Dixiecrats held their convention in Birmingham, Alabama, where they nominated Thurmond for president and Fielding L. Wright, governor of Mississippi, for vice president. Dixiecrat leaders worked to have Thurmond-Wright declared the "official" Democratic Party ticket in Southern states.  They succeeded in Alabama, Louisiana, Mississippi, and South Carolina; in other states, they were forced to run as a third-party ticket. Preston Parks, elected as a presidential elector for Truman in Tennessee, instead voted for the Thurmond-Wright ticket. Leander Perez attempted to keep the States Rights Party alive in Louisiana after 1948.

Similar breakaway Southern Democratic candidates running on states' rights and segregationist platforms would continue in 1956 (T. Coleman Andrews), and 1960 (Harry F. Byrd). None would be as successful as the American Independent Party campaign of George Wallace, the Democratic governor of Alabama, in 1968. Wallace had briefly run in the Democratic primaries of 1964 against Lyndon Johnson, but dropped out of the race early. In 1968, he formed the new American Independent Party and received 13.5% of the popular vote, and 46 electoral votes, carrying several Southern states. The AIP would run presidential candidates in several other elections, including Southern Democrats (Lester Maddox in 1976 and John Rarick in 1980), but none of them did nearly as well as Wallace.

1980–1999

After 1968, with desegregation a settled issue, conservative Democrats, mostly Southerners, managed to remain in the United States Congress throughout the 1970s and 1980s. These included Democratic House members as conservative as Larry McDonald, who was also a leader in the John Birch Society. During the administration of Ronald Reagan, the term "boll weevils" was applied to this bloc of conservative Democrats, who consistently voted in favor of tax cuts, increases in military spending, and deregulation favored by the Reagan administration but were opposed to cuts in social welfare spending.

Boll weevils was sometimes used as a political epithet by Democratic Party leaders, implying that the boll weevils were unreliable on key votes or not team players. Most of the boll weevils either retired from office or (like Senators Phil Gramm and Richard Shelby) switched parties and joined the Republicans. Since 1988, the term boll weevils has fallen out of favor.

Some Democratic leaders during the 1980s did turn toward conservative views, albeit very different from the previous incarnations of southern Democrats. In 1988, Joe Lieberman defeated Republican U.S. Senate incumbent Lowell Weicker of Connecticut by running to the right of Weicker and receiving the endorsements of the Moral Majority and the National Rifle Association. Colorado governor Richard Lamm, and former Minnesota Senator and presidential candidate Eugene McCarthy both took up immigration reduction as an issue. Lamm wrote a novel, 1988, about a third-party presidential candidate and former Democrat running as a progressive conservative, and Lamm himself would go on to unsuccessfully seek the nomination of the Reform Party in 1996. McCarthy began to give speeches in the late 1980s naming the Internal Revenue Service, the Federal Communications Commission, and the Federal Election Commission as the three biggest threats to liberty in the United States.

Arthur Schlesinger Jr., known during the 1950s and 1960s as a champion of "Vital Center" ideology and the policies of Harry S. Truman and John F. Kennedy, wrote a 1992 book, The Disuniting of America critical of multiculturalism.

2001–present
During the 2006 midterm elections, the Democratic Party ran moderates and even a few conservative Democrats for at-risk Republican seats. The Blue Dog Democrats gained nine seats during the elections. The New Democrats had support from 27 of the 40 Democratic candidates running for at-risk Republican seats.

In South Carolina in 2008, the Democratic candidate for United States Senator was Bob Conley, a traditional Catholic and a former activist for the presidential candidacy of Ron Paul. Conley failed in his bid to defeat Republican Lindsey Graham, receiving 42.4 percent of the vote.

In his 2010 campaign for reelection, Walter Minnick, U.S. Representative for Idaho's 1st congressional district, was endorsed by Tea Party Express, an extremely rare occurrence for a Democrat. Minnick was the only Democrat to receive a 100% rating from the Club for Growth, an organization that typically supports conservative Republicans. Minnick lost to Raúl Labrador, a conservative Republican, in the general election.

The Washington Post noted the most influential U.S. House of Representatives voting bloc was the conservative Democrat Blue Dog Coalition, having over 50 members.

Modern conservative Democrats include Zell Miller, and Joe Lieberman.

In the 2018 House of Representatives elections, the Democratic Party nominated moderate to conservative candidates in many contested districts and won a majority in the chamber. In the aftermath of the elections, the Blue Dog Coalition expanded to 27 members.

Blue Dog Coalition

The Blue Dog Coalition was formed in 1995 during the 104th Congress to give members from the Democratic Party representing conservative-leaning districts a unified voice after Democrats' loss of Congress in the 1994 Republican Revolution. The coalition consists of centrist and conservative Democrats.

The term "Blue Dog Democrat" is credited to Texas Democratic U.S. Representative Pete Geren (who later joined the Bush administration). Geren opined that the members had been "choked blue" by Democrats on the left. It is related to the political term "Yellow Dog Democrat", a reference to Southern Democrats said to be so loyal they would even vote for a yellow dog before they would vote for any Republican. The term is also a reference to the "Blue Dog" paintings of Cajun artist George Rodrigue of Lafayette, Louisiana.

The Blue Dog Coalition "advocates for fiscal responsibility, a strong national defense and bipartisan consensus rather than conflict with Republicans". It acts as a check on legislation that its members perceive to be too far to the right or the left on the political spectrum. The Blue Dog Coalition is often involved in searching for a compromise between liberal and conservative positions. As of 2014, there was no mention of social issues in the official Blue Dog materials.

Ideology and polls
In 2019, the Pew Research Center found that 14% of Democratic and Democratic-leaning registered voters identify as conservative or very conservative, 38% identify as moderate, and 47% identify as liberal or very liberal.

According to a 2015 poll from the Pew Research Center, 54% of conservative and moderate Democrats supported same-sex marriage in 2015. This figure represented an increase of 22% from a decade earlier.

Current officeholders

United States Senators
 Joe Manchin, Senator from West Virginia (2010–), Chair of the Senate Energy Committee (2021–), and Ranking Member of Senate Energy Committee (2019–2021)

United States Representatives
Sanford Bishop, United States Representative from Georgia's 2nd congressional district (1993–).
Jim Costa, member of the United States House of Representatives from California's 16th congressional district (2013–) and California's 20th congressional district (2005–2013), member of the California Senate from the 16th district (1995–2002), and member of the California State Assembly from the 30th district (1978–1994).
Henry Cuellar, member of the United States House of Representatives from Texas's 28th congressional district (2005–), 102nd Texas Secretary of State (2001), and member of the Texas House of Representatives (1987–2001).
Josh Gottheimer, member of the United States House of Representatives from New Jersey's 5th congressional district (2017–), attorney, and writer.
David Scott, member of the United States House of Representatives from Georgia's 13th congressional district (2003–), Chair of the House Agriculture Committee (2021–), member of the Georgia State Senate from the 36th district (1983–2003), and member of the Georgia House of Representatives (1975–1983).

Governors
 John Bel Edwards, Governor of Louisiana (2016–).

County Level 
Mark Hackel, County Executive of Macomb County, MI (2011–)

Former officeholders

Presidents of the United States
 Franklin Pierce, 14th President of the United States (1853–1857), United States Senator from New Hampshire (1837–1842), member of the United States House of Representatives from New Hampshire's at-large congressional district (1833–1837), Speaker of the New Hampshire House of Representatives (1831–1833), member of the New Hampshire House of Representatives from Hillsborough (1829–1833), Town Meeting Moderator for Hillsborough, New Hampshire (1829–1836), brigadier general in the United States Army (1847–1848), and colonel in the New Hampshire Militia (1831–1847).
 Andrew Johnson, 17th President of the United States (1865–1869), 16th Vice President of the United States (1865), United States Senator from Tennessee (1875, 1857–1862), Military Governor of Tennessee (1862–1865), 15th Governor of Tennessee (1853–1857), member of the U.S. House of Representatives from Tennessee's 1st congressional district (1843–1853), Mayor of Greeneville, Tennessee (1834–1835), and brigadier general in the United States Army (1862–1865).
 Grover Cleveland, 22nd and 24th President of the United States (1885–1889) and (1893–1897), 28th Governor of New York (1883–1885), 35th Mayor of Buffalo, New York (January 2, 1882November 28, 1882), 12th Sheriff of Erie County, New York, (1871–1873). He was a pro-business Bourbon Democrat and fiscal conservative.

Vice Presidents of the United States 

 John C. Calhoun, 7th Vice President of the United States (1825–1832), United States Senator from South Carolina (1845–1850), 16th United States Secretary of State (1844–1845), 10th Secretary of War (1817–1825), Member, United States House of Representatives from South Carolina's 6th District (1811–1817). He was a supporter of slavery, state sovereignty and a proponent of the theory of nullification. 
 Thomas A. Hendricks, 21st Vice President of the United States (1885), 16th Governor of Indiana (1873–1877), United States Senator from Indiana (1863–1869), and member of the United States House of Representatives from Indiana's 6th congressional district (1853–1855) and Indiana's 5th congressional district (1851–1853).
 John Nance Garner, 32nd Vice President of the United States (1933–1941), Member, United States House of Representatives from 15th District of Texas (1903–1933), 39th Speaker of the House of Representatives (1931–1933), House Minority Leader (1929–1931), Leader, House Democratic Caucus (1929–1933), Member, Texas House of Representatives from Texas 91st District (1899–1903), County Judge, Uvalde County Texas (1893–1896).  He supported the poll tax.  Although he served as vice president under Franklin D. Roosevelt, he turned against Roosevelt during his second term, taking a more conservative stance on several issues.

United States Governors
James E. Broome, 3rd Governor of Florida (1853–1857).
Samuel J. Tilden, 25th Governor of New York (1875–1876), member of the New York State Assembly from Manhattan's 18th district (1872) and Manhattan's at-large, multi-member district (1846–1847), Chair of the New York Democratic Party (1866–1874), Corporation Counsel of New York City (1843–1844), and presidential nominee for the Democratic Party in the 1876 presidential election.  He was a conservative "hard money" Democrat.
Francis T. Nicholls, 28th Governor of Louisiana (1888–1892, 1877–1880), brigadier general in the Confederate States Army (1861–1865), and 2nd lieutenant in the United States Army (1855–1856).
George B. McClellan, 24th Governor of New Jersey (1878–1881), Commanding General of the United States Army (1861–1862), major general in the United States Army (1846–1857), and presidential nominee for the Democratic Party in the 1864 presidential election. His term as governor was marked by careful, conservative management.
Duncan Clinch Heyward, 88th Governor of South Carolina, (1903–1911).
James E. Ferguson, 26th Governor of Texas (1915–1917), First Gentleman of Texas (1933–1935, 1925–1927), and presidential nominee for the American Party in the 1920 presidential election.
Miriam A. Ferguson, 29th and 32nd Governor of Texas (1925–1927, 1933–1935) and First Lady of Texas (1915–1917). She was a fiscal conservative.
William H. Murray, 9th Governor of Oklahoma (1931–1935), member of the United States House of Representatives from Oklahoma's 4th congressional district (1915–1917) and Oklahoma's at-large congressional district (1913–1915), 1st Speaker of the Oklahoma House of Representatives (1907–1909), and member of the Oklahoma House of Representatives (1907–1909).
Coke R. Stevenson, 35th Governor of Texas (1941–1947), 31st Lieutenant Governor of Texas (1939–1941), Speaker of the Texas House of Representatives (1933–1939), and member of the Texas House of Representatives from the 86th district (1929–1939).
Chauncey Sparks, 41st Governor of Alabama (1943–1947).
George Bell Timmerman Jr., 105th Governor of South Carolina (1955–1959) and 76th Lieutenant Governor of South Carolina (1947–1951).
Ross Barnett, 53rd Governor of Mississippi (1960–1964).
John Connally, 39th Governor of Texas (1963–1969), 61st United States Secretary of the Treasury (1971–1972), 56th United States Secretary of the Navy (1961), and lieutenant commander in the United States Navy. Joined the Republican Party in 1973.
 George Wallace, 45th Governor of Alabama (1983–1987, 1971–1979, and 1963–1967), First Gentleman of Alabama (1967–1968), member of the Alabama House of Representatives from Barbour County (1946–1952), and presidential nominee for the American Independent Party in the 1968 presidential election.
Lurleen Wallace, 46th Governor of Alabama (1967–1968), First Lady of Alabama (1963–1967).
Lester Maddox, 75th Governor of Georgia (1967–1971), 7th Lieutenant Governor of Georgia (1971–1975), presidential nominee for the American Independent Party in the 1976 presidential election.
John Bell Williams, 55th Governor of Mississippi (1968–1972), member of the United States House of Representatives from Mississippi's 3rd congressional district (1963–1968), Mississippi's 4th congressional district (1953–1963), and Mississippi's 7th congressional district (1947–1953).
Bob Casey Sr., 42nd Governor of Pennsylvania (1987–1995), 45th Auditor General of Pennsylvania (1969–1977), and member of the Pennsylvania State Senate from the 22nd district (1963–1968).
Joan Finney, 42nd Governor of Kansas (1991–1995), 33rd Kansas State Treasurer (1975–1991). Former Republican (before 1974). She was anti-abortion.
Phil Bredesen, 48th Governor of Tennessee (2003–2011), and 66th Mayor of Nashville (1991–1999).
Bill Ritter, 41st Governor of Colorado (2007–2011) and District Attorney of Denver (1995–2005). Ritter has aligned himself with the left wing of the Democratic Party, supporting abortion rights and funding, universal healthcare, environmental protection, a progressive energy policy, raising taxes, and welfare, but strongly opposed same-sex marriage, illegal immigration, and labor unions as well as supporting a tough-on-crime policy.
Homer Martin Adkins, 32nd Governor of Arkansas (1941–1945), he was a states' rights advocate and social conservative.
Eugene Talmadge, Governor of Georgia (1933-1937) and (1941-1943), he was elected to another term in 1946 but died before taking office in 1947.  He actively promoted segregation, white supremacy and racism in the Georgia university system.  He governed as a southern conservative who opposed Franklin D. Roosevelt and the New Deal.

United States Senators
 John S. Barbour Jr., Senator from Virginia (1889–1892), Member United States House of Representatives, Virginia 8th District of Virginia (1881–1887).  He was the founder of a conservative political machine, later known as the Byrd Organization, which dominated Virginia politics for 80 years.
 Lloyd Bentsen, United States Senator from Texas (1971–1993), 69th United States Secretary of the Treasury (1993–1994), Chair of the Senate Finance Committee (1987–1993), member of the United States House of Representatives from Texas's 15th congressional district (1948–1955), and vice presidential nominee for the Democratic Party in the 1988 presidential election.
 Edward R. Burke Senator from Nebraska (1935–1941), Member, United States House of Representatives (1933–1935), Member, Omaha Board of Education (1927–1930), originally a supporter of the First New Deal, he opposed the Second New Deal, Franklin D. Roosevelt's court packing plan, elements of his foreign policy and opposed his reelection in 1940.
 Harry F. Byrd Jr., Senator from Virginia (1965–1983), Virginia State Senate 24th District (1958–1965), Virginia State Senate, 25th District (1948–1958). He was a Democrat before 1970 and an independent after 1970.
 Harry F. Byrd, Senator from Virginia (1933–1965), Governor of Virginia (1926–1930).
 Bennett Champ Clark Senator from Missouri (1933–1945); helped organize Conservative Coalition.
 David Worth Clark, Senator from Idaho (1939–1945), member, House of Representatives from Idaho's Second District (1935–1939).
 Kent Conrad, Senator from North Dakota (1992–2013, 1987–1992), Chair of the Senate Budget Committee (2007–2013, 2001–2003), and 19th Tax Commissioner of North Dakota (1981–1986).
 Joe Donnelly, Senator from Indiana (2013–2019) and member of the United States House of Representatives from Indiana's 2nd congressional district (2007–2013).
 James Eastland, Senator from Mississippi (1941) and (1943–1978).
 Allen J. Ellender, Senator from Louisiana (1937–1972), President Pro Tempore, United States Senate (1971–1972), chairman, Senate Committee on Agriculture (1955–1971), chairman, Senate Committee on Appropriations (1971–1972), 54th Speaker of the Louisiana House of Representatives (1932–1936), He voted with the Conservative Coalition 77% of the time. He signed the Southern Manifesto in 1956.
 Wendell Ford, Senator from Kentucky (1974–1999), Senate Minority Whip (1995–1999), Senate Majority Whip (1991–1995), 53rd Governor of Kentucky (1971–1974), 45th Lieutenant Governor of Kentucky (1967–1971), and member of the Kentucky Senate from the 8th district (1966–1967).
 Carter Glass, Senator from Virginia (1920–1946), President Pro-Tempore of the Senate (1941–1945), chairman, Senate Appropriation Committee (1933–1946), 47th Secretary of the Treasury (1918–1920), member, United States House of Representatives from 6th District of Virginia (1902–1918), chairman, House Banking Committee (1913–1918), Member, Virginia State Senate, District 20 (1899–1902). He was a member of the Conservative Byrd Machine who opposed the New Deal and supported States Rights and fiscal conservatism.
 Walter F. George, United States Senator from Georgia (1922–1957), President pro-tempore of the Senate (1955–1957), Associate Justice of the Georgia Supreme Court (1917–1922),he was considered a conservative who declined to endorse Franklin D. Roosevelt in the 1932 presidential election and opposed Roosevelt's court packing plan in 1937.  Although regarded more moderate on racial matters than many southern politicians, he signed the 1956 Southern Manifesto and presented it to the Senate.
 Wade Hampton III, Senator from South Carolina (1879–1891), 77th Governor of South Carolina (1877–1879), Member, South Carolina State Senate from Richland County, South Carolina (1858–1961), Member, South Carolina General Assembly from Richland County (1852–1858). He was a leader among Redeemers, the Southern wing of the Bourbon Democrats.
 Howell Heflin, Senator from Alabama (1979–1997), chairman, Senate Ethics Committee (1987–1992), 24th Chief Justice, Alabama Supreme Court (1971–1977).
 Heidi Heitkamp, Senator from North Dakota (2013–2019), 28th Attorney General of North Dakota (1992–2000), and 20th Tax Commissioner of North Dakota (1986–1992).
 Clyde R. Hoey, Senator from North Carolina (1945–1954), 59th Governor of North Carolina (1937–1941), Member, United States House of Representatives from North Carolina's 9th District (1919–1921), Member, North Carolina State Senate (1902–1904), Member, North Carolina House of Representatives (1898–1902). He was a conservative and a segregationist.
 Rush Holt Sr., Senator from West Virginia (1935–1941), Member, West Virginia House of Delegates (1931–1935, 1942–1953, 1954–1955). He was ranked the third most conservative Democrat serving in the Senate from 1932 and 1977. He was a Democrat before 1944 and a Republican afterward.
 Spessard Holland, Senator from Florida (1946–1971), 28th Governor of Florida (1941–1945), Member Florida Senate, 7th District (1932–1940).
 George S. Houston, Senator from Alabama (03-04-1879–12-31-1879), 24th Governor of Alabama (1874–1878), Member, United States House of Representatives, Alabama 5th District (1843–1849) and (1851–1861), Alabama At Large District (1841–1843), chairman, House Democratic Caucus (1859–1861). He was a Bourbon Democrat.
 Lucius Q. C. Lamar, Senator from Mississippi (1877–1885), Associate Justice of the United States Supreme Court (1888–1893). Lamar was a Southern Redeemer who later became known for his advocacy of racial reconciliation.
 Mary Landrieu, Senator from Louisiana (1997–2015), Chair of the Senate Energy Committee (2014–2015), Chair of the Senate Small Business Committee (2009–2014), Treasurer of Louisiana (1988–1996), and member of the Louisiana House of Representatives (1980–1988).
 Joe Lieberman, Senator from Connecticut (1989–2013), Chair of the Senate Homeland Security and Governmental Affairs Committee (2007–2013, 2001–2003, 2001), 21st Attorney General of Connecticut (1983–1989), member of the Connecticut State Senate from the 10th district (1973–1981) and 11th district (1971–1973), and vice presidential nominee for the Democratic Party in the 2000 presidential election. Opposed the public health insurance option
 John L. McClellan, Senator from Arkansas (1943–1977), Member, United States House of Representative from the 6th District, Arkansas (1935–1939).
 Pat McCarran, Senator from Nevada (1933–1954), Chief Justice of the Supreme Court of Nevada (1917–1919) Associate Justice, Supreme Court of Nevada (1913–1917), Nye County, Nevada District Attorney (1907–1909), Member, Nevada Assembly, Washoe County (1903–1905).
 Zell Miller, Senator from Georgia (2000–2005), 79th Governor of Georgia (1991–1999), 8th Lieutenant Governor of Georgia (1975–1991), member of the Georgia State Senate from the 50th district (1963–1965) and 40th district (1961–1965), and sergeant in the United States Marine Corps (1953–1956).
 Ben Nelson, Senator from Nebraska (2001–2013), 37th Governor of Nebraska (1991–1999), and Director of the Nebraska Department of Insurance (1975–1976).
 W. Lee O'Daniel, Senator from Texas (1941–1949), 34th Governor of Texas (1939–1941). He endorsed the Texas Regulars.
 John H. Overton, Senator from Louisiana (1933–1948), Member United States House of Representatives, 8th District, Louisiana (1931–1933). Originally a supporter of Huey Long, while in the Senate, he generally voted with the Conservative Coalition.
 John M. Palmer (politician), Senator from Illinois (1891–1897), 15th Governor of Illinois (1869–1873), he was a conservative Gold Democrat, who supported Cleveland. He was the presidential candidate of the Bourbon Democratic National Democratic Party (United States) in 1896.
 Mark Pryor, Senator from Arkansas (2003–2015), 53rd Attorney General of Arkansas (1999–2003), and member of the Arkansas House of Representatives (1991–1995).
 James A. Reed, Senator from Missouri (1911–1929), Mayor of Kansas City, Missouri (1904–1906), city councilor, Kansas City, (1897–1998), county prosecutor Jackson County, Missouri (1898–1900). He opposed the League of Nations and supported immigration reform to exclude Asian and African immigration.
 Absalom Willis Robertson, Senator from Virginia (1946–1966), Member, United States House of Representatives, Virginia At Large District (1933–1935), 7th District (1935–1946), Commonwealth Attorney, Rockbridge County, Virginia (1922–1928). He was a Dixiecrat and member of the Conservative Coalition who opposed Civil Rights.
 Richard Russell Jr., Senator from Georgia (1933–1971), 66th governor of Georgia (1931–1933). Russell was a founder of the conservative coalition.
 Richard Shelby, Senator from Alabama (1987-2023), member of the United States House of Representatives, Alabama's 7th District (1979-1987), member of Alabama State Senate, 16th District (1971-1979), he was one of the more conservative Democrats in the House of Representatives and a member of the boll weevils.  In 1994, he switched his party affiliation from Democrat to Republican.  
 Ellison D. Smith, Senator from South Carolina (1909–1944), South Carolina House of Representatives, Sumter County (1892–1901), he opposed women's suffrage, opposed a federal minimum wage, in World War II, he opposed the national war mobilization effort, and opposed immigration.  His opposition to the New Deal caused Franklin D. Roosevelt to try to defeat him in the 1938 Democratic primary, but he was reelected.  He supported Republican Thomas E. Dewey for president in 1944.  
 Willis Smith, Senator from North Carolina (1950–1953), North Carolina House of Representatives (1928–1932), when he ran for the Senate in 1950, the liberal wing of the party opposed him, but he was aided by conservative Jesse Helms.
 Arlen Specter, Senator from Pennsylvania (1981–2011), Chair of the Senate Judiciary Committee (2005–2007), Chair of the Senate Veterans' Affairs Committee (2003–2005, 1997–2001), Chair of the Senate Intelligence Committee (1995–1997), 19th District Attorney of Philadelphia (1966–1974), and first lieutenant in the United States Air Force (1951–1953). Republican from 1965 to 2009.
 John C. Stennis, United States Senator from Mississippi (1947–1989).
 Herman Talmadge, United States Senator from Georgia (1957–1981), Chair of the Senate Committee on Agriculture, Nutrition and Forestry (1971–1981), and 71st Governor of Georgia (1948–1955 and 1947).
 Strom Thurmond, Senator from South Carolina (1956–2003, 1954–1956), president pro tempore emeritus of the United States Senate (2001–2003) president pro tempore of the United States Senate (2001, 1995–2001, 1981–1987), Chairman of the Senate Armed Services Committee (0995–1999), Chairman of the Senate Judiciary Committee (1981–1987), 103rd Governor of South Carolina (1947–1951), member of the South Carolina Senate from Edgefield County (1933–1938), and presidential nominee for the State's Rights Democratic Party in the 1948 presidential election. Joined the Republican Party in 1964. 
 Millard Tydings Representative and Senator Maryland, serving in the House from 1923 to 1927 and in the Senate from 1927 to 1951. He was a wet—an opponent of Prohibition and fought for its repeal in 1933.  After giving moderate support to the New Deal, he broke with President Franklin Roosevelt over the "court packing" proposal in 1937. Roosevelt campaigned in person against his reelection in 1938, but Tydings won and helped form the Conservative Coalition.
 Frederick Van Nuys, Senator from Indiana (1933 to 1944). Active opponent of Roosevelt's "court packing" proposal in 1937.
 William Freeman Vilas, Senator from Wisconsin (1881–1889), 17th United States Secretary of the Interior (1888–1889), 33rd United States Postmaster General (1885–1889), he was a prominent Bourbon Democrat and a chief organizer of the conservative National Democratic Party.
 David I. Walsh, Senator, Massachusetts (1926–1947), 46th Governor of Massachusetts (1914–1916), 43rd Lieutenant Governor of Massachusetts (1913–1914).  He was an isolationist member of the America First Committee.

Members of the U.S. House of Representatives 
Dale Alford, Member of the United States House of Representatives from Arkansas 5th District (1959–1963), Member, Little Rock School Board (1955–1959)
William Barksdale, Member of the United States House of Representatives from Mississippi At Large District (1853–1955) and 3rd District (1855–1861).  He was killed at the Battle of Gettysburg.
John Barrow, Member of the United States House of Representatives from Georgia's 12th congressional district  (2005–2015).
 Iris Faircloth Blitch, Member of United States House of Representatives from Georgia's 8th District (1955–1963), Member, Georgia Senate (1947–1949) and (1953–1954), Member, Georgia House of Representatives (1947–1949), Georgia Democratic Party National Committee member (1948–1954). She was a signer of the 1956 Southern Manifesto.  In 1964, she changed her party affiliation from Democrat to Republican and endorsed Barry M. Goldwater for president.
 Dan Boren, Member of the United States House of Representatives from Oklahoma's 2nd district (2005–2013) and Member of the Oklahoma House of Representatives from the 28th district (2002–2004)
Glen Browder, Member of the United States House of Representatives from Alabama's 3rd district (1989–1997), Secretary of State of Alabama (1987–1989) and Member of the Alabama House of Representatives (1983–1986)
Bill Brewster, Member of the United States House of Representatives from Oklahoma's 3rd district (1991–1997), and Oklahoma House of Representatives (1983–1990)
Scotty Baesler, Member of the United States House of Representatives from Kentucky's 6th district (1993–1999), Mayor of Lexington, Kentucky (1981–1993) and Judge of the Fayette County District Court (1979–1981)
Martin Dies Jr., Member, United States House of Representatives, Texas 2nd District (1931–1945) and Texas At Large District (1953–1959), chairman, House Committee Investigating Un-American Activities (1936–1944). A conservative, he was a signer of the Southern Manifesto.
William Jennings Bryan Dorn, Member, United States House of Representatives, South Carolina 3rd District (1947–1949) and (1951–1974), chairman, United States Veterans Affairs Committee (1973–1974), Member, South Carolina State Senate from Greenwood County (1941–1942), Member, South Carolina House of Representatives, Greenwood county (1939–1940), He was a signer of the Southern Manifesto. In 1966, it was reported that the conservative Liberty Lobby had given him a "Statesman of the Republic" award for his conservative voting record.
Walter Flowers, Member, United States House of Representatives, Alabama 5th District (1969–1973), 7th District (1973–1979), a conservative Democrat, he was national chairman of George Wallace's campaign for president in 1972.
John Flynt, Member of the United States House of Representatives from Georgia 4th District (1954–1965) and 6th District (1965–1979), Member, Georgia House of Representatives (1947–1948). He was considered one of the most conservative Democrats in the House in his time.
Ezekiel C. Gathings, Member of the United States House of Representatives from the Fourth District of Arkansas (1939–1969), Chairman of the House Select Committee on Current Pornographic Materials in 1952, member, Arkansas Senate, 32nd District (1935–1939).  He was a conservative segregationist.
Pete Geren, United States Secretary of the Army (2007–2009), United States Under Secretary of the Army (2006–2007), Acting United States Secretary of the Air Force (2005), Member of the United States House of Representatives from Texas's 12th district (1989–1997)
Ralph Hall, Member of the United States House of Representatives from Texas 4th District (1981–2015), Chairman of House Science Committee (2011–2013), Member, Texas Senate, 9th District (1963–1973), county judge, Rockwell County, Texas (1950–1962).  He described himself as a conservative Democrat, until 2004, when he switched to Republican.
Burr Harrison, Member of the United States House of Representatives from 7th District of Virginia (1946–1963), member Virginia State Senate, 25th District (1940–1943).  He was a member of the conservative Byrd Organization who supported Massive Resistance to desegregation and was a signer of the Southern Manifesto against the Supreme Court decision requiring desegregation of public schools.
F. Edward Hebert, Member of the United States House of Representatives from the 1st District of Louisiana (1941–1977), chairman, Armed Services Committee (1971–1975). He was an opponent of desegregation and signed the Southern Manifesto. He served on the House Committee on Un-American Activities.
Andy Ireland, Member of the United States House of Representatives from Florida's 8th District (1977–1983) and 10th District (1983–1993).  He was a Democrat until 1984, when he switched to Republican.
Laurence M. Keitt, Member of the United States House of Representatives from South Carolina 3rd District (1856–1860)
Dan Lipinski, Member of the United States House of Representatives from Illinois's 3rd district (2005–2021) 
Alexander Long, Member of the United States House of Representatives from Ohio's 2nd District (1863–1865), Member, Ohio House of Representatives from Hamilton County (1846–1850).  Elected as a "free-soil" Democrat, he became a "copperhead" opponent of the Civil War, who supported states' rights and opposed emancipation and suffrage for African-Americans.  
Speedy Long, Member of the United States House of Representatives from the 8th District of Louisiana (1965–1973), District Attorney for the 28th Judicial District of Louisiana (1973–1985), he was an outspoken segregationist.
Bill Orton, Member of the United States House of Representatives from Utah's 3rd district (1991–1997) 
 John Otho Marsh Jr., Member of the United States House of Representatives from the 7th District of Virginia (1963–1971), Assistant Secretary of Defense for Legislative Affairs (1973–1979), Counselor to the President (1974–1977), 14th Secretary of the Navy (1981–1989). He was a Democrat until the 1980s and a Republican afterwards.
 Ben McAdams, Member of the United States House of Representatives from Utah's 4th congressional district (2019–2021), Mayor of Salt Lake County (2013–2019), and Member of Utah Senate (2009–2012). 
 Jim Matheson, Member of the United States House of Representatives from Utah's 2nd congressional district (2001–2013) and Member of the United States House of Representatives from Utah's 4th congressional district (2013–2015).
 Larry McDonald, Member, United States House of Representatives, Georgia, 7th District (1975–1983), second president of the John Birch Society beginning in 1983.
 John J. O'Connor (1923–1938), from Manhattan. He was a spokesman for big business and Roosevelt campaigned successfully to deny him renomination in 1938.
 Otto Passman, Member, United States House of Representatives, Louisiana 5th District (1947–1977).  He was known for his opposition to Foreign Aid spending. 
 Collin Peterson, Chair of the House Agriculture Committee (2007–2011; 2019–2021), Member of the United States House of Representatives from Minnesota's 7th district (1991–2021) 
 Samuel B. Pettengill, Member, United States House of Representatives, Indiana Second District, (1933–1939), Indiana 13th District (1931–1933), Although he served in Congress as a Democrat, he later switched to Republican and was elected Chairman of the Republican National Finance Committee in 1942.  He was the author of several conservative books.
 Lewis F. Payne Jr., Member of the United States House of Representatives from Virginia's 5th district (1988–1997)
 Mike Ross, Member of the United States House of Representatives from Arkansas's 4th district (2001–2013)
John E. Rankin, Member of the United States House of Representatives from Mississippi 1921–1953.  A strong anti-communist, he was one of the founders of the House Un-American Activities Committee.  Although he originally supported some New Deal legislation, he later supported the Conservative Coalition.
John Rarick, Member of the United States House of Representatives from Louisiana 6th District (1967–1975). Ran for president in 1980 on the American Independent Party ticket.
L. Mendel Rivers, Member, United States House of Representatives from South Carolina 1st District (1941–1970), member, South Carolina House of Representatives, Charleston County (1934–1936). He was an ardent segregationist, a supporter of law and order politics and a war hawk during the Vietnam Conflict.
Tommy F. Robinson, Member, United States House of Representatives from Arkansas 2nd District, (1985–1991), sheriff, Pulaski County, Arkansas (1981–1984).  In Congress, he often clashed with Democratic leadership and was identified with the Boll Weevil faction of the Democratic party.  In 1989, he switched his party affiliation from Democrat to Republican, saying the Democratic party had become too liberal.
Armistead I. Selden Jr., Member, United States House of Representative from Alabama's 6th District (1953–1963), At Large (1963–1965), and 5th District (1965–1969), Member, Alabama House of Representatives (1951–1952), United States Ambassador to Fiji, Tonga and Western Samoa (1974–1978), United States Ambassador to New Zealand (1974–1979), United States Ambassador to Samoa (1974–1979).  He was originally a Democrat until 1979, when he switched to Republican.
Jouett Shouse, Member of the United States House of Representatives from 7th District of Kansas (1913–1919). He was known as a conservative who opposed the New Deal.  He was president of the conservative American Liberty League from 1934 to 1940.
Howard W. Smith, Member of the United States House of Representatives from the 8th District of Virginia (1931–1967), Chairman of the House Rules Committee (1955–1967). He was a member of the Conservative Coalition.
Bob Stump, Member of the United States House of Representatives from the 3rd District of Arizona (1977–2003). He had a very conservative voting record.  He was a Democrat from 1977 to 1983, and a Republican afterwards.
Martin L. Sweeney, Member of the United States House of Representatives from 20th District of Ohio (1931–1943). He was a judge of the Municipal Court of Cleveland, Ohio (1924–1932). He opposed a peacetime draft and was considered an isolationist.
James Traficant, Member of the United States House of Representatives from Ohio's 17th District (1985–2002), Sheriff of Mahoning County, Ohio (1981–1984).  After the Republicans took control of Congress in 1995, he tended to vote with them more than the Democrats.  He favored immigration restriction and voted anti-abortion.  When he voted for a Republican for Speaker of the House, the Democrats stripped him of all committee assignments.
William David Upshaw, Member of the United States House of Representatives from Georgia's 5th District (1919–1927). A supporter of Prohibition, he was the presidential candidate of the Prohibition Party in 1932. He was a member of the Ku Klux Klan.
Joe Waggonner, Member of the United States House of Representatives from the 4th District of Louisiana (1961–1979), member, Louisiana State Board of Education (January 1961 – December 1961), member Bossier Parish School Board (1954–1960). He was a fiscal conservative "Boll weevil" who opposed many federal spending programs and Civil Rights legislation.
Francis E. Walter, Member of the United States House of Representatives, Pennsylvania 24th District (1933–1945), 20th District (1945–1953), and 15th District (1953–1963).  He was chairman of the House Committee on Un-American Activities.

Cabinet members 

 Charles S. Fairchild 38th United States Secretary of the Treasury (1887–1889) he was a Gold Democrat and noted anti-suffragist
 Robert Lansing served as Secretary of State under President Woodrow Wilson from 1915 to 1920, during World War I and the Paris Peace Conference, 1919. A conservative pro-business Democrat, he was pro-British and a strong defender of American rights at international law. He was a leading enemy of German autocracy and Russian Bolshevism.
 Daniel Manning 37th United States Secretary of the Treasury (1885–1887), he was a fiscal conservative and supporter of the gold standard
 James Clark McReynolds 48th United States Attorney General (1913–1914), Associate Justice of the United States Supreme Court (1914–1941), on the Supreme Court, he was one of four conservative justices who consistently voted to find New Deal legislation unconstitutional.

Mayors 
 James D. Griffin, mayor of Buffalo, New York (1978-1993).  He served in the New York State Senate, 56th District (1967-1977), and on the Buffalo Common Council (2004-2005).  Although a registered Democrat, he was very conservative, especially on social issues and was often crossed-endorsed by the Republican and Conservative Parties.  During the "Spring of Life" demonstrations in April 1992, he encouraged right to life groups such as Operation Rescue to demonstrate in Buffalo.  
 William Robinson Pattangall, mayor of Waterville, Maine (1911–1913) and later chief justice of the state Supreme Judicial Court. Earlier supportive of progressive Democrats including Woodrow Wilson, Pattangall endorsed Herbert Hoover over Al Smith in the 1928 United States presidential election and became an opponent of Franklin D. Roosevelt's New Deal on conservative grounds. Pattangall later switched party affiliation to become a Republican.
 Frank Rizzo, 93rd Mayor of Philadelphia (1972–1980) and Commissioner of the Philadelphia Police Department (1967–1971). (Former Democrat)

See also

 Barnburners and Hunkers
 Black conservatism in the United States
 Blue Dog Coalition
 Boll weevil (politics)
 Bourbon Democrat
 Byrd Machine
 Conservative coalition
 Conservative Democrat (South Korea)
 Conservative Manifesto
 Copperheads (politics)
 Democrat in Name Only
 Democrats for Life of America
 Dixiecrat
 Factions in the Democratic Party (United States)
 Fire-Eaters
 Hispanic and Latino conservatism in the United States
 History of the United States Senate
 Hunkers, in 19c New York state
 Jeffersonian democracy
 LaRouche movement
 LGBT conservatism in the United States
 Libertarian Democrat
 National Democratic Party (United States)
 New Democrats
 Pork Chop Gang
 Reagan Democrat
 Redeemers
 Red Shirts (United States)
 Regular Democratic Organization
 Rockefeller Republican
 Southern Manifesto
 Straight-Out Democratic Party
 Texas Regulars
 Yellow dog Democrat

References

Further reading
 Dunn, Susan. Roosevelt’s Purge: How FDR Fought to Change the Democratic Party (2012) in 1938 link
 Finley, Keith M. Delaying the Dream: Southern Senators and the Fight Against Civil Rights, 1938–1965 (LSU Press, 2008).  
 
 Frederickson, Kari A. The Dixiecrat revolt and the end of the Solid South, 1932-1968 ( Univ of North Carolina Press, 2001).
 Heineman, Kenneth J. "Catholics, Communists, and Conservatives: The Making of Cold War Democrats on the Pittsburgh Front." US Catholic Historian (2016): 25–54. online
 Katznelson, Ira, and Quinn Mulroy. "Was the South pivotal? Situated partisanship and policy coalitions during the New Deal and Fair Deal." Journal of Politics 74.2 (2012): 604–620. online
 Katznelson, Ira, Kim Geiger, and Daniel Kryder. ‘‘Limiting Liberalism: The Southern Veto in Congress, 1933–1950.’’ Political Science Quarterly 108 (1993): 283–306 online
 Malsberger, John W. From Obstruction to Moderation: The Transformation of Senate Conservatism, 1938–1952. (Susquehanna U. Press 2000).
 Manley, John F. "The conservative coalition in Congress." American Behavioral Scientist 17.2 (1973): 223–247.
 Mead, Howard N. "Russell vs. Talmadge: Southern Politics and the New Deal." Georgia Historical Quarterly (1981) 65#1: 28–45.
 Moore, John Robert. "The Conservative Coalition in the United States Senate, 1942–1945." Journal of Southern History (1967): 368–376. online
 Patterson, James T. "A conservative coalition forms in Congress, 1933–1939." Journal of American History 52.4 (1966): 757–772. online
 Rubin, Ruth Bloch. Building the bloc: Intraparty organization in the US Congress (Cambridge University Press, 2017).
 Shelley II, Mack C. The Permanent Majority: The Conservative Coalition in the United States Congress (1983).
 Ward, Jason Morgan. Defending White Democracy: The Making of a Segregationist Movement and the Remaking of Racial Politics, 1936–1965 (Univ of North Carolina Press, 2011).
 Young, Cheryl D., John J. Hindera, and Gregory S. Thielemann. "The Conservative Coalition in a New Era: Regionalism and Ideology." Southeastern Political Review 24.1 (1996): 178–188.

External links
 Right Democrat: a blog for conservative Democrats
 The Vanishing Moderate Democrat: a New York Times article

Democratic Party (United States)
Conservatism in the United States
Right-wing populism in the United States
Factions in the Democratic Party (United States)
Political terminology of the United States